Glen Morgan Williams (February 17, 1920 – November 4, 2012) was a United States district judge of the United States District Court for the Western District of Virginia.

Education and career

Born in Jonesville, Virginia, Williams received an Artium Baccalaureus degree from Milligan College in 1940, and enrolled in the fall of 1941 at the University of Virginia School of Law. After the outbreak of World War II, he enlisted in the United States Navy, having never seen the ocean. During his officer training, he was a roommate of Herman Wouk, who told of their experiences in the opening chapter of The Caine Mutiny. Williams was a Lieutenant in the United States Navy during World War II, from 1942 to 1946. After his discharge, he returned to law school and received a Juris Doctor from the University of Virginia School of Law in 1948. Before his graduation, he was elected Commonwealth's attorney of Lee County, Virginia in 1948, and served in that position until 1952. He was in private practice in Jonesville from 1952 to 1976. He was a member of the Virginia Senate from 1953 to 1955. Williams was a part-time United States magistrate judge for the United States District Court for the Western District of Virginia from 1963 to 1975. In 1964, Williams ran as the Republican nominee for Congress in Virginia's Ninth District but lost to the incumbent, W. Pat Jennings.

Federal judicial service

Williams was a federal judge on the United States District Court for the Western District of Virginia. Williams was nominated by President Gerald Ford on September 8, 1976, to a seat on the United States District Court for the Western District of Virginia vacated by Judge Theodore Roosevelt Dalton, after Senator William L. Scott derailed the nomination of the President's first choice. He was confirmed by the United States Senate on September 17, 1976, and received his commission the same day. He assumed senior status on November 21, 1988. Williams took inactive senior status in February 2010.

Law clerks

Williams' former law clerks include Cynthia D. Kinser, the first woman to serve as Chief Justice of the Supreme Court of Virginia; George Allen, who served as Governor of Virginia and a member of the United States Senate; Karen Gould, the first woman to serve as executive director of the Virginia State Bar; Virginia Circuit Court judges Randall Lowe and John Kilgore; United States Magistrate Judge Cynthia Eddy of the Western District of Pennsylvania; United States Bankruptcy Judge Trish Brown of the District of Oregon.

Notable cases

Williams' most famous cases involved the coal mining industry. He wrote an opinion addressing the constitutionality of the Surface Mining Control and Reclamation Act of 1977. The Supreme Court agreed in part and disagreed in part with his conclusions. He dealt with the civil disobedience of the United Mine Workers of America in connection with the Pittston Coal strike in 1989–1990. He enjoined the members of the Bituminous Coal Operators Association to pay more for the health care of 100,000 retired and disabled miners, in a case that led to the passage of the Coal Act, 26 U.S.C. 9701, et seq.

Death

Williams donated his papers to the Appalachian School of Law. He died November 4, 2012, at the age of 92, in Johnson City, Tennessee.

References

External links
 
 SENATE JOINT RESOLUTION NO. 5063, honoring Judge Glen M. Williams
 "Judge Glen M. Williams, 'A Member of the Greatest Generation,'" by Judge James P. Jones”
 Tribute to Judge Glen Morgan Williams, 152 Cong. Rec. S10448 (Sept. 28, 2006), remarks of Senators Allen and Warner
 HONORING U.S. DISTRICT JUDGE GLEN WILLIAMS, ___ Cong. Rec. ___ (Nov. 15, 2012), remarks of Rep. Griffith

1920 births
2012 deaths
20th-century American judges
United States Navy personnel of World War II
Judges of the United States District Court for the Western District of Virginia
Milligan University alumni
People from Jonesville, Virginia
United States district court judges appointed by Gerald Ford
United States magistrate judges
United States Navy officers
University of Virginia School of Law alumni
Republican Party Virginia state senators